Fribourg Cathedral is a Roman Catholic cathedral in Fribourg, Switzerland, built in the Gothic style, on a rocky outcrop 50 metres above the river Sarine (Saane), dominating the medieval town below. It is the episcopal seat of the Diocese of Lausanne, Geneva and Fribourg.

History

The main body of the church was started in 1283 and completed by 1430. The tower was completed in 1490. It is 76 metres tall and houses 11 bells. It also features a rose window above the main portal with stained glass by Harrison Weltlich (1988). The stained-glass windows, designed by the Polish painter Jozef Mehoffer and made by local craftsmen Kirsch & Fleckner between 1896 and 1936, constitute one of the most important collections of religious Art Nouveau stained-glass windows.

Originally a parish church, in 1945 it became the cathedral of the Diocese of Lausanne, Geneva and Fribourg.

Gallery

External links 
 STnicolas.ch: Cathedral of St. Nicholas, Fribourg website

Roman Catholic cathedrals in Switzerland
Buildings and structures in the canton of Fribourg
Roman Catholic churches completed in 1430
Tourist attractions in the canton of Fribourg
Gothic architecture in Switzerland
15th-century Roman Catholic church buildings in Switzerland